Walter Newberry may refer to:

Walter C. Newberry, U.S. Representative from Illinois
Walter Loomis Newberry, American businessman and philanthropist